Atoconeura kenya is a species of dragonfly in the family Libellulidae. It is native to eastern Africa, where it is known from Kenya, Tanzania, Uganda, and the Republic of South Sudan. It lives near mountain streams. It is widespread, but in some areas it is affected by the degradation of its habitat.

References 

Libellulidae
Insects described in 1953
Insects of Kenya
Insects of Uganda
Insects of Tanzania
Fauna of South Sudan
Taxonomy articles created by Polbot